António Vozone (born 16 June 1960) is a Portuguese equestrian. He competed in the individual jumping event at the 1996 Summer Olympics.

References

1960 births
Living people
Portuguese male equestrians
Olympic equestrians of Portugal
Equestrians at the 1996 Summer Olympics
Sportspeople from Lisbon